John Bowen (1756–19 June 1832) was an English painter, genealogist and antiquarian.

Life
Bowen was the eldest son of James Bowen, painter and topographer, of Shrewsbury, where the younger Bowen was born. Bowen studied local antiquities under his father; traced out the pedigrees of Shropshire families, and became skilful in deciphering and copying ancient manuscripts. He died on 19 June 1832, aged 76.

Works
In 1795 he sent a drawing of the Droitwich town seal to the Gentleman's Magazine, signing himself 'Antiquarius;' and in 1802 he followed this up with another communication, to which he put his initials. He drew four views of Shrewsbury, which were engraved by Vandergucht (Gough, Topography, ii. 177), and in the Philosophical Transactions is a plate of some Roman inscriptions from his hand.

References

Attribution

1756 births
1832 deaths
Artists from Shrewsbury
English antiquarians
18th-century English painters
English male painters
19th-century English painters
English genealogists
19th-century English male artists
18th-century English male artists